Mário Bicák (born 21 October 1979) is a Slovak football midfielder.

He came to Spartak Trnava in summer 2010.

References

External links

1979 births
Living people
Sportspeople from Prešov
Slovak footballers
Slovakia international footballers
FC Steel Trans Ličartovce players
FC VSS Košice players
Győri ETO FC players
FC Spartak Trnava players
Slovak Super Liga players
Association football midfielders